V. K. Balan Nair (born 1947) was the head of Uttar Pradesh Police from 28 June 2003 - 11 Jan 2005. He received the Indian Police Medal for meritorious service and President's Police Medal for distinguished service. He is an IPS officer of the 1971 cadre.

References 

1947 births
Living people
Indian police chiefs
Uttar Pradesh Police
Indian Police Service officers
People from Pathanamthitta district